Glass House is an electoral district of the Legislative Assembly in the Australian state of Queensland.

The electorate is based mostly on the hinterland areas of the Sunshine Coast and north of Caboolture, it stretches north to Witta, south to the northern outskirts of Caboolture and west to Conondale.

Members for Glass House

Election results

References

External links
 

Glass House
Sunshine Coast, Queensland